Nicholas William Preston (born 22 January 1972) is an English former professional cricketer. He played for Kent County Cricket Club

Preston was born at Dartford in Kent and first played for the county's Second XI in 1990. He made his first-class cricket debut for the side in May 1996 and went on to make nine first-class and six List A appearances for the Kent First XI as a seam bowler - all but one of them during 1996. He played once against Cambridge University in 1997 and continued playing for the Second XI until the end of the season before being released by the club. He is married to Mandy Preston and has two children Oliver and Tyla Preston

References

External links
 

1972 births
Living people
English cricketers
Kent cricketers
Sportspeople from Dartford